Josh Emmons is an American novelist. He studied at UC Santa Cruz, Oberlin College and the Iowa Writers' Workshop (2002).  Emmons published his first book, The Loss of Leon Meed, in 2005. Set in his native northern California, about the varied responses of ten small-town residents to a stranger's mysterious appearances and disappearances, it was a Book Sense pick and winner of a James Michener-Copernicus Society of America Award, and has been translated into several languages. His second, Prescription for a Superior Existence, which explores the intersections of faith, religion and desire, came out in 2008. His latest book, "A Moral Tale and Other Moral Tales," comes out April 2017 by Dzanc. His fiction and non-fiction have been published in various magazines and newspapers.

Emmons has taught at the University of the Arts, Loyola University Chicago, the University of Iowa, Whitman College, and elsewhere. He currently teaches at University of California, Riverside while living in Pasadena with his daughter.

Novels
 Prescription for a Superior Existence (Scribner, 2008)
 The Loss of Leon Meed (Scribner, 2005)

Honors
 New York Times Noteworthy Paperback
 PEN Writer's Grant
 James Michener-Copernicus Society of America Award
 Book Sense Pick

External links
 UCR Department of Creative Writing 
 Simon & Schuster profile 
 "Living With Music: A Playlist"  on The New York Times PaperCuts blog
 Essay on Esquire.com 
 "Concord" , a short story on FiveChapters
 Interview at EarthGoat 
 Interview at Philadelphia Stories magazine [6]

21st-century American novelists
Oberlin College alumni
Loyola University Chicago faculty
University of Iowa faculty
Whitman College faculty
Year of birth missing (living people)
Living people
University of the Arts (Philadelphia) faculty
American male novelists
American male essayists
21st-century American essayists
21st-century American male writers
Novelists from Pennsylvania
Novelists from Illinois
Novelists from Washington (state)
Novelists from Iowa
Monmouth University faculty